The Idaho Republican Party (IDGOP) is the Idaho state affiliate of the United States Republican Party, headquartered in Boise. It is currently the dominant party in the state, controlling both of Idaho's U.S. House seats, both U.S. Senate seats, the governorship, and has supermajorities in both houses of the state legislature.

History
By the time of the 1889 Constitutional Convention, the Republican Party had become a prominent Party in Idaho, and made up the majority of the representatives at the Constitutional Convention for statehood. Republicans and Democrats had equal influence in Idaho until the 1960s when the Republican Party emerged as the dominant political Party. The Republican Party has held the governorship since 1995, both US Senate seats since 1981, and both US House seats since 2010.

As of 2022, Idaho has the second largest percentage of Republicans in a state legislature. Republicans control all constitutional offices in the state and maintain supermajorities in the House and Senate.

Governing body

 State Central Committee: The governing body of the Idaho Republican Party is the Republican State Central Committee, which is made up of elected members from each legislative district and county. It establishes the rules and functions of the Idaho Republican Party on the state level.
 Chairman and executive committee: The current chairman of the Idaho Republican Party is Dorothy Moon. Moon was elected in July 2022, defeating incumbent Tom Luna. She drew praise from conservatives for her conservative voting record. 

The executive committee consists of a first and second vice chair, secretary, treasurer, finance chair, region chairs from each of Idaho's seven regions, and the presidents of the affiliated clubs; Young Republicans, College Republicans, and Republican Women. Members of the executive committee who are not Region Chairs are elected at the State Convention, held bi-annually.

Meetings
Meetings of both the State Central Committee and the State Executive Committee are usually held every six months, including those held in proximity to State Conventions.

The party convened in July 2022 to consider a resolution declaring that Joe Biden had not been legitimately elected president of the United States.

Regions
Regions of the IDGOP are groups of Idaho Counties defined by Article III, Section 1 of the State Rules.

Current Republican officeholders

Members of Congress

U.S. Senate

U.S. House of Representatives

Statewide offices

 Lieutenant Governor: Scott Bedke
 Secretary of State: Phil McGrane
 Attorney General: Raúl Labrador
 State Treasurer: Julie Ellsworth
 Superintendent of Public Instruction: Debbie Critchfield

State legislators

Idaho Senate
Republicans currently hold 28 out of 35 seats in the Idaho Senate.

Idaho House of Representatives
Republicans currently hold 58 out of 70 seats in the Idaho House of Representatives.

Legislative leadership

Senate
 President Pro Tem of the Senate: Chuck Winder
Majority Leader of the Senate: Kelly Anthon
 Assistant Majority Leader of the Senate: Abby Lee
 Majority Caucus Chair of the Senate: Mark Harris

House
Speaker of the House: Mike Moyle
 Majority Leader of the House: Megan Blanksma
 Assistant Majority Leader of the House: Sage Dixon
 Majority Caucus Chair of the House: Dustin Manwaring

Chairs of IDGOP

Election results

Presidential

Gubernatorial

References

External links
 Idaho Republican Party

Republican Party
Republican Party (United States) by state